Taojiang County is a county in the Province of Hunan, China, it is under the administration of Yiyang Prefecture-level City.

Located in the north central part of the province, the county is bordered to the north by Hanshou County and Dingcheng District of Changde City, to the east by Ziyang and Heshan Districts, to the south by Ningxiang County, to the west by Anhua County. The county has 12 towns and 3 townships under its jurisdiction, the county seat is Taohuajiang.

Administrative divisions
According to the result on adjustment of township-level divisions of Taojiang County in 2005, Taojiang County has 15 township-level divisions under its jurisdiction; and Zhanxi Township was renamed as Zhanxi Town in 2011, Taojiang County has 12 towns and 3 townships under its jurisdiction. they are:

12 Towns
 Daligang
 Huishangang
 Lucidu
 Majitang
 Niutian, Taojiang
 Santangjie
 Shiniujiang
 Songmutang
 Taohuajiang
 Wutan, Taojiang
 Xiushan, Taojiang
 Zhanxi, Taojiang: Zhanxi Township was renamed Zhanxi Town of the present name in 2011.

3 Townships
 Fuqiushan
 Gaoqiao, Taojiang
 Zhabu, Taojiang

Climate

References

External links 

 
County-level divisions of Hunan
Geography of Yiyang